The Mitchell colonial by-election, 1870 was a by-election held on 8 February 1870 in the electoral district of Mitchell for the Queensland Legislative Assembly.

History
On 3 December 1869, Edward Lamb, member for Mitchell, resigned. Archibald Buchanan won the resulting by-election on 8 February 1870; however, it emerged he had not nominated as a candidate and had been elected against his own wishes, and he resigned two days later.

See also
 Members of the Queensland Legislative Assembly, 1868–1870

References

1870 elections in Australia
Queensland state by-elections
1870s in Queensland